Out All Night may refer to:

 Out All Night (TV series), American sitcom
 Out All Night (1927 film), American film
 Out All Night (1933 film), American comedy film